Donoso District is a district (distrito) of Colón Province in Panama. The population according to the 2000 census was 9,671; the latest official estimate (for 2019) is 14,798. The district, while lies along the Caribbean coast in the west of the province, covers a total area of 1,826 km². The capital lies at the town of Miguel de la Borda.

Administrative divisions
Donoso District is divided administratively into the following corregimientos:

Miguel de la Borda (capital)
Coclé del Norte
El Guásimo
Gobea
Río Indio
San José del Genera

References

Districts of Colón Province